Stanisław Styrczula (26 January 1929 – 17 August 2020) was a Polish biathlete. He competed in the 20 km individual event at the 1964 Winter Olympics.

References

1929 births
2020 deaths
Polish male biathletes
Olympic biathletes of Poland
Biathletes at the 1964 Winter Olympics
People from Tatra County